Stephen Michael Kelly  is an American Jesuit priest and peace activist. He spent six years in prison for hammering on D-5 Trident missiles and other Plowshares movement actions. He has spent at least a decade behind bars, with six of those years in solitary confinement.

Kelly was ordained a Jesuit priest in 1990. He is a member of the Jesuits West U.S. province.

He gave the homily at the funeral Mass of Daniel Berrigan.

Kings Bay Plowshares
On April 4, 2018, he took part in the Kings Bay Plowshares action.

For his part in the action, he was sentenced to 33 months in jail, three years probation, and a share of the $33,503.51 in restitution. The judge gave him credit for the 30 months he spent in jail awaiting trial and sentencing.

References

20th-century American Jesuits
21st-century American Jesuits
Living people
American Christian pacifists
Catholic Workers
American human rights activists
Year of birth missing (living people)